Verster is a Dutch and Afrikaans surname. Notable people with the surname include:

Floris Verster (1861–1927), Dutch painter
François Verster (born 1969), South African film director and documentary maker
Jacobus Verster (1919–1981), South African military commander

Afrikaans-language surnames
Surnames of Dutch origin